Kobuk Airport  is a state-owned public-use airport located in Kobuk, a city in the Northwest Arctic Borough of the U.S. state of Alaska.

As per the Federal Aviation Administration, this airport had 1,176 passenger boardings (enplanements) in calendar year 2008, 1,048 in 2009, and 1,255 in 2010. The National Plan of Integrated Airport Systems for 2011–2015 categorized it as a general aviation facility (the commercial service category requires at least 2,500 enplanements per year).

Facilities and aircraft 
Kobuk Airport covers an area of 167 acres (68 ha) at an elevation of 142 feet (43 m) above mean sea level. It has one runway designated 9/27 with a gravel surface measuring 4,020 by 75 feet (1,225 x 23 m).

For the 12-month period ending September 29, 2011, the airport had 5,000 aircraft operations, an average of 13 per day, 100% air taxi.

Airlines and destinations

The following airline offers scheduled passenger service:

Prior to its bankruptcy and cessation of all operations, Ravn Alaska served the airport from multiple locations.

Statistics

References

External links
 FAA Alaska airport diagram (GIF)
 Topographic map from USGS The National Map
 

 

Airports in Northwest Arctic Borough, Alaska
Airports in the Arctic